The Earldom of Warrington is a title which has been created twice in British history, in 1690 and 1796 respectively. For information on the 1690 creation, see Booth baronets. For information on the 1796 creation, see Earl of Stamford.

See also 
 Dunham Massey
 Earldom
 House of Lords

External links 
 Burke's Peerage & Baronetage

Extinct earldoms in the Peerage of England
Extinct earldoms in the Peerage of Great Britain
Noble titles created in 1690
Noble titles created in 1796